Tseung Kwan O Tunnel is a 900-metre tunnel beneath Ma Yau Tong in Hong Kong. The tunnel was opened on 9 November 1990. Part of Route 7, it links Sau Mau Ping, Kwun Tong, Kowloon and the Tseung Kwan O New Town, Sai Kung District, the New Territories. It was used by 80,385 vehicles daily in 2011.

The flat toll fee for the tunnel is HK$3 since opening. The toll fee has been waived since the opening of Tseung Kwan O–Lam Tin Tunnel on 11 December 2022. 

This tunnel is connected to Tseung Kwan O Road on the Kowloon side along with its toll plaza, and Tseung Kwan O Tunnel Road on the Tseung Kwan O side.

Tseung Kwan O Tunnel is currently managed by Greater Lucky (H.K.) Company Limited.

See also
Transport in Hong Kong
List of tunnels and bridges in Hong Kong

References

Sau Mau Ping
Tseung Kwan O
Ma Yau Tong
Road tunnels in Hong Kong
Route 7 (Hong Kong)
Tunnels completed in 1990
1990 establishments in Hong Kong